Leucoperichaetium is a genus of moss in family Grimmiaceae.

It contains the following species (but this list may be incomplete):

 Leucoperichaetium eremophilum, Magill

References 

Moss genera
Grimmiales
Taxonomy articles created by Polbot